Who's Sorry Now? is the third studio album by Babyland, released on  November 10, 1995 by Flipside Records.

Reception

Ned Raggett of AllMusic says "Babyland kicks in its third release very much following its established path from previous releases, but not shirking from tweaks and changes that Dan and Smith find them necessary." The critic went on to say "the duo's musical relationship was perhaps even stronger than before, bolstered by the years of performing together, which resulted in some fascinating, gripping new songs." Black Monday praised the album for showcasing the band's artistic growth and said "Babyland's style successfully blends elements of punk, techno, industrial/noise, and now even a little hip hop." Sonic Boom gave the album a mixed reception and said "audience ends up feeling restricted by the single channel of exchange and much of the message is lost in the translation."

Track listing

Personnel 
Adapted from the Who's Sorry Now? liner notes.

Babyland
 Dan Gatto – lead vocals, keyboards, production
 Michael Smith – percussion, production

Production and design
 Aartvark – cover art, photography
 Tom Grimley – production
 Stephen Marcussen – mastering

Release history

References

External links 
 
 Who's Sorry Now? at iTunes

1995 albums
Babyland albums